Osteocephalus is a genus of frogs, the slender-legged tree frogs, in the family Hylidae found in the Guianas, the Amazon Basin, Venezuela, Colombia, southeastern Brazil, and north-eastern Argentina. Males are warty, while females are smooth.

Species
There are currently 25 described species in Osteocephalus:
 O. alboguttatus  
 O. buckleyi  — Buckley's slender-legged tree frog
 O. cabrerai 
 O. camufatus  
 O. cannatellai  
 O. carri  
 O. castaneicola  
 O. deridens  
 O. duellmani  
 O. festae  
 O. fuscifacies 
 O. helenae 
 O. heyeri  
 O. leoniae  
 O. leprieurii  — Cayenne slender-legged tree frog 
 O. mimeticus 
 O. mutabor  
 O. oophagus 
 O. planiceps 
 O. sangay  — Sangay casqued tree frog
 O. subtilis  — Brazilian slender-legged tree frog
 O. taurinus  — Manaus slender-legged tree frog
 O. verruciger  — Ecuador slender-legged tree frog
 O. vilarsi 
O. yasuni

References

  (1995a): Description of a central Amazonian and Guianan tree frog, genus Osteocephalus (Anura, Hylidae), with oophagous tadpoles. - Alytes, Paris 13(1), pp. [1-13]
  (2000): Two new species of hylid frogs, genus Osteocephalus, from Amazonian Ecuador. - Amphibia-Reptilia 21(3), pp. [327-340]
  (2002): A new species of Osteocephalus from Ecuador and a redescription of O. leprieurii (Duméril & Bibron, 1841) (Anura: Hylidae). - Amphibia-Reptilia 23(1), pp. [21-46]
Jungfer, K.-H., J. Faivovich, J.M. Padial, S. Castroviejo-Fisher, M. Lyra, B. Von Muller Berneck, P. Iglesias, P.J.R. Kok, R.D. MacCulloch, M.T. Rodrigues, V.K. Verdade, C.P. Torres Gastello, J.C. Chaparro, P.H. Valdujo, S. Reichle, J. Moravec, V. Gvoždík, G. Gagliardi-Urrutia, R. Ernst, I. De la Riva, D.B. Means, A.P. Lima, J.C. Señaris, W.C. Wheeler and C.F.B. Haddad. (2013). Systematics of spiny-backed treefrogs (Hylidae: Osteocephalus) an Amazonian puzzle. Zoologica Scripta 42: 351–380.

External links
 . 2007. Amphibian Species of the World: an Online Reference. Version 5.1 (10 October 2007). Osteocephalus. Electronic Database accessible at http://research.amnh.org/herpetology/amphibia/index.php. American Museum of Natural History, New York, USA. (Accessed: Apr 24, 2008). 
  [web application]. 2008. Berkeley, California: Osteocephalus. AmphibiaWeb, available at http://amphibiaweb.org/. (Accessed: Apr 24, 2008). 
  taxon Osteocephalus at http://www.eol.org.
  Taxon Osteocephalus at https://www.itis.gov/index.html. (Accessed: Apr 24, 2008).
  Taxon Osteocephalus at http://data.gbif.org/welcome.htm

 
Hylidae